Anton Venier was an Austrian luger who competed in the early 1960s. He won a bronze medal in the men's doubles event at the 1963 FIL World Luge Championships in Imst, Austria.

Venier also won two medals at the 1962 FIL European Luge Championships in Weissenbach, Austria with a gold in the men's doubles and a silver in the men's singles event.

References

Austrian male lugers
Possibly living people
Year of birth missing